Peter Michael Alexander Wilson  (born 31 March 1968) is a civil servant whose most recent post was to serve as Principal Private Secretary to the Prime Minister of the United Kingdom. He has also served as British Ambassador to Brazil, British Ambassador to the Netherlands and Permanent Representative of the United Kingdom to the Organisation for the Prohibition of Chemical Weapons.

Early life 
Wilson is a son of David Wilson, Baron Wilson of Tillyorn. He was educated at Eton and Merton College, Oxford. He also has a MPA degree from the Kennedy School of Government at Harvard University.

Career 
Wilson joined the Foreign and Commonwealth Office (FCO) in 1992 and was posted to Beijing where he studied Mandarin at the University of International Business and Economics. He served at the British embassy in Beijing 1995–98. In early 1999 he was appointed to the cabinet of Sir Leon Brittan, who was a Vice-President of the European Commission. After Brittan resigned with the rest of the Santer Commission in March 1999, Wilson continued as First Secretary at the UK representation to the EU. He was head of the Strategic Policy Team at the FCO 2003–04; Political Counsellor at Islamabad 2005–06 and at Beijing 2007–10; and Director, Asia Pacific, at the FCO 2010–13. He was deputy permanent representative to the United Nations (with the rank of ambassador) 2013–17.

In January 2017 the FCO announced Wilson's appointment as Ambassador to the Netherlands. He took up the post when King Willem-Alexander received his credentials on 23 August 2017. On 30 August that same year he presented his credentials to the Organisation for the Prohibition of Chemical Weapons. In January 2021 he was appointed Ambassador to Brazil.

On 8 March 2022 Wilson was announced as Principal Private Secretary to the Prime Minister of the United Kingdom, filling the vacancy that had been left by Martin Reynolds' resignation earlier that year. However, Wilson vacated the role after six months when Liz Truss became Prime Minister on 6 September 2022 and appointed Nick Catsaras as her new Principal Private Secretary.

Personal life 
Wilson is married and has three children.

Honours 
Wilson was appointed CMG in the 2013 Birthday Honours "for services to strengthening British foreign policy in Asia".

References 

1968 births
Living people
People educated at Eton College
Alumni of Merton College, Oxford
Members of HM Diplomatic Service
Ambassadors of the United Kingdom to the Netherlands
Permanent Representatives of the United Kingdom to the Organisation for the Prohibition of Chemical Weapons
Companions of the Order of St Michael and St George
Harvard Kennedy School alumni
Sons of life peers
20th-century British diplomats
Principal Private Secretaries to the Prime Minister